Ellenvatnet or Ellenvatn is a lake located  Sør-Varanger Municipality in Troms og Finnmark county, Norway.

The lake is located within Øvre Pasvik National Park, just northwest of the lake Ødevatnet. Ellenvatnet is the park's largest lake, located centrally in the park and is drained from the north through the river Ellenelva. Ellenvatnet is shallow and has a long and crooked shoreline with a large number of small islands. It has two enclosed bays to the south, Parvatn and Skinnposevatn. From Parvatnet a short river leads up to Grenseparvatnet (Kertusjärvi) at the border with Finland.

See also
List of lakes in Norway

References

Sør-Varanger
Lakes of Troms og Finnmark